Zhangyi is a town under the administration of Yuanzhou District, Guyuan, Ningxia, China. , it administers the following 15 villages:
Zhangyi Village
Maozhuang Village
Hetao Village
Tianpu Village
Yanguan Village
Huangpu Village
Nanwan Village
Shangmaquan Village
Yanni Village
Chengou Village
Dadian Village
Machang Village
Tuoxiang Village
Songwa Village
Hongzhuang Village

References 

Township-level divisions of Ningxia
Guyuan